The UCI Track Cycling World Championships – Men's points race is the world championship points race held annually at the UCI Track Cycling World Championships. It was first held at the 1980 championships in Besançon, France. , Urs Freuler from Switzerland is the most successful cyclist with eight victories.

Medalists

Medal table

External links
Track Cycling World Championships 2016–1893 bikecult.com
World Championship, Track, Points race, Elite cyclingarchives.com

 
Men's points race
Lists of UCI Track Cycling World Championships medalists